Fox Crane is a fictional character on the NBC/DirecTV soap opera Passions and was portrayed by Justin Hartley from December 16, 2002 to February 10, 2006, and Midland lead singer Mark Cameron Wystrach from February 14, 2006, to September 7, 2007. Actor Nick Stabile took over the role temporarily following the 2004 Summer Olympic Games (which preempted Passions for two weeks), while Hartley's wife, fellow Passions star Lindsay Hartley was on maternity leave. Fox, as played by Hartley, was a fan favorite among Passions viewers.

In the show, Fox becomes infatuated with Whitney Russell; he plots to woo Whitney away from her boyfriend, Chad, but eventually decides to respect her wishes and ends his attempts. He then engages in a brief relationship with his half-brother's ex-fiancé, Theresa Lopez-Fitzgerald, played by Hartley's real-life wife, Lindsay Hartley. Though their pairing lasts fewer than six months, Soap Opera Digest readers continued to vote Fox and Theresa as their favorite Passions couple until Justin Hartley left the role in 2006.

After breaking up with Theresa, Fox resumes his pursuit of Whitney, who breaks up with Chad when it is falsely revealed that the two are half-siblings. Their romantic progress is hindered by the fact that Whitney is secretly pregnant with Chad's child and trying to pass the baby off as Fox's; when she uses Fox's power of attorney to give "their" son up for adoption, Fox and Whitney's relationship essentially comes to an end. Miles's true paternity is eventually revealed, and Fox moves on with Kay Bennett. Fox is deeply in love with Kay and cares deeply for her toddler daughter, Maria, and Fox and Kay become engaged. However, the return of Maria's father, Miguel Lopez-Fitzgerald, eventually leads Kay to realize that her heart lies with Miguel and not Fox. In a desperate attempt to keep Kay, Fox enlists his father's help to fake a terminal illness in order to guilt Kay into marrying him and staying with him.  Kay eventually discovers his duplicity, however, and leaves him.

After breaking up with Kay, Fox begins a relationship with his sister's best friend, Esme Vanderheusen. The two believe that they have found true love when Fox is shot and killed in his bedroom by an unseen sniper on September 17, 2007; the murderer is eventually revealed to be Esme's fifteen-year-old niece, Viki.

Character history

Early life
Nicholas Foxworth Crane was born sometime between late 1980 and 1982, the third of six children born to Julian Linus Crane, eldest child of ruthless billionaire Alistair Ephraim Crane and Katherine Barrett, and Ivy Winthrop, daughter of the late former governor Harrison Winthrop and the late Helen Revere-Mott-Beaton. Fox, as he was eventually nicknamed, was descended from numerous wealthy and prominent families that immigrated to North America before the American Revolutionary War — his paternal grandfather is a descendant of William Ephraim Crane, a magistrate who ordered Tabitha Lenox's execution in 1693, thus sparking the witch's vendetta against the Crane family, and his maternal grandmother was a descendant of Paul Revere.  Fox is predominantly of English descent, though he does have some French ancestry, and he was raised in the Roman Catholic Church.

Fox was raised as the third of four children — in 2001, his older brother, Ethan Crane (now Winthrop), approximately five to eight years his senior, was revealed to be the product of their mother's adulterous affair with now-police chief Sam Bennett. Fox also has two sisters — Fancy Crane is one to two years his senior, while Pretty Crane is a few years his junior.  While they were raised in the lap of luxury, the Crane siblings, excluding Ethan, had a dysfunctional childhood, with Ivy admitting that her youngest three children had a father who was "either absent or intoxicated" and a mother "who just didn't care".  Ivy favored Ethan over her other children because he was the son of her "true love", Sam Bennett, and not her husband, whom she loathed, and Fox, as well as his sisters, came to resent their mother for this.  Unlike his sisters, however, Fox also came to resent Ethan for their mother's favoritism, and the two men shared an adversarial relationship until the stillbirth of Ethan's daughter, Sarah Winthrop, in 2003. Fox also bore a great deal of anger towards his father, also unlike his sisters, and the two did not improve their relationship until 2006.

Fox, like Fancy and Pretty, was sent away to boarding school at a young age.  Fox was popular and excelled at swimming, but he was also a troublemaker, and Julian and Ivy eventually sent him to Europe to attend school.  After graduating from boarding school, Fox went on to attend university, but eventually became bored with his studies and dropped out, taking up gambling to keep himself occupied.  Fox quickly gambled his trust fund away, however, and, upon seeing a news report regarding Ethan's marriage to Gwen Hotchkiss, he decides to finally return to Harmony.

Return home and infatuation with Whitney, 2002 - 2003
Few, if any, members of Fox's family are happy to have the young man return to Harmony, and they are all even less thrilled when they learn that he has gambled his money away.  The only person not irritated by his presence is his new, young stepmother, Theresa, and Fox quickly becomes friends with her, mostly to annoy his family, who despise her. It is through Theresa that Fox meets her best friend, Whitney Russell; Fox, despite his status as a womanizer, falls for the young woman, unaware that his father and her mother were once lovers. In Los Angeles, Fox teams up with Theresa, whose marriage to Julian is revealed to be a practical joke, and agrees to help her separate Ethan and Gwen if she helps him to win his "mystery woman" from her boyfriend. Fox also pays record producer Chad's new singer, Syd Valentine, to seduce Chad and bring an end to Chad's relationship with Whitney.

Things grow complicated when Chad's vengeful wife, LaToya, shoots Whitney for sleeping with Chad. Whitney makes a full recovery, and Fox is thrilled when Whitney leaves Chad for failing to tell her about his previous marriage. Shortly after Fox and Whitney's return to Harmony, however, they are followed by Chad, and after a heart-to-heart with his father, Fox realizes that, if he truly loves Whitney, he must give her up.

Relationship with Theresa, 2003 - 2004
Whitney eventually comes to believe that Theresa is Fox's mystery woman, and, instead of correcting her, Fox goes along with her assumption, willing to settle for a relationship with his good friend if he cannot be with Whitney. The two eventually become lovers, and Fox supports Theresa when she loses custody of her son to Julian and Rebecca, who then allow Ethan and Gwen to adopt the boy. Fox also continues to aid Theresa in her schemes to see her son and regain custody of him, including drugging Ethan and Gwen's surrogate and having herself implanted with their embryo.

Fox and Theresa's relationship eventually ends when Theresa confesses that she has been unfaithful - Fox later learns that she drugged Ethan in an attempt to become pregnant after she believed that she had a miscarriage - and the two part on good terms.

Relationship with Whitney, 2004 - 2005
After breaking up with Theresa, Fox returns to pining for Whitney. Though Whitney shows signs of affection for Fox, she is still engaged to Chad. Their relationship quickly falls apart, however, when Alistair reveals that Chad's biological parents are Julian and Eve Russell, making Chad the half-brother to both Whitney and Fox. Whitney is horrified to learn that she has slept with her own brother, and she turns to Fox in her despair.

Fox and Whitney eventually become a couple, and Fox is thrilled when Whitney tells him that she is expecting his child. Close to Whitney's due date, a mentally unstable Gwen kidnaps Ethan and Theresa's newborn daughter, Jane, and flees the country with her; when Fox sets off to find his sister-in-law and niece, Whitney convinces him to give her his power of attorney in the event that she needs to conduct any business on his behalf. Fox tracks Gwen and Jane, along with his grandmother, Katherine, to Alistair's Crane compound in the North Atlantic, where he, Ethan, and Theresa rescue the three females. When Fox returns home, he learns that Whitney gave birth to his son and is thrilled - until he learns that she used his power of attorney to give the boy up for adoption. Fox tries to reverse the adoption, but the time limit has expired, and Chad adopts the boy, whom he names Miles Davis Harris. Chad refuses to allow Fox to see his son and largely uses Miles as a way to be close to Whitney.

Whitney's decision to give Miles up for adoption destroys her relationship with Fox. Eventually, both Chad and Fox learn the truth - Chad actually fathered Miles, and Whitney tried to pass him off as Fox's son in order to protect him from the stigma of being the product of incest.

Relationship with Kay, 2005 - 2007
While trying to get over Whitney, Fox meets Kay Bennett on the wharf one night. The two bicker, but when a tsunami later hits, the two seek solace together and have sex. Eventually, the two enter into a relationship, and Fox begins to dream of a life with Kay and her young daughter, Maria.  After numerous near-misses, Fox finally successfully proposes to Kay, and she happily accepts.

Shortly after they become engaged, Kay's ex and Maria's father, Miguel Lopez-Fitzgerald, returns to Harmony. In order to be close to Maria, Miguel moves into Tabitha's home with Fox and Kay, and when he begins dating Siren, she also moves in. When Kay begins to raise objections to Miguel's relationship with Siren, Fox begins to fear that Kay's opposition stems from jealousy. Eventually, Fox overhears Kay and Miguel making plans to call off her engagement and reunite, and Fox, in a desperate attempt to keep Kay, fakes a terminal illness in order to guilt her into staying with him. Fox's plot works, and he and Kay are married, despite Miguel's accusations that Fox is not really dying, on January 10, 2007.

Despite their nuptials, Kay continues to stand by Miguel's side when he is falsely charged and convicted of deliberately running Fox down with his car. Julian arranges for Miguel to be released from prison on the condition that Kay ends her relationship with Miguel, but Kay is unable to honor her end of the bargain. During a confrontation, Ivy inadvertently reveals that Fox is not really dying, and a furious Kay leaves him for Miguel.

Relationship with Esme and death, 2007
While drowning his sorrows in a bar, Fox comes across his older sister Fancy's best friend, Esme Vanderheusen. Esme has fallen upon hard times — her father cut her off financially, and she has left the legal guardian of her fifteen-year-old niece, Viki - and Fox generously allows Esme and Viki to live at the Crane mansion as long as necessary. Fox and Esme eventually have sex, and the two declare that they have found their soulmate. Their happiness is cut tragically short, however, when Fox is shot in the chest on September 7, 2007, and eventually dies on September 17. Esme is devastated by his death, as are his parents and sisters, and they swear to find the culprit. The audience eventually learns in January 2008 that the sniper, and the murderer of all of Esme's other boyfriends, is none other than Viki, who feared that Fox would send her away to boarding school if he married Esme.

See also
Crane family
Bennett and Standish families

References and footnotes

External links

Justin Hartley's Official Website

soapcentral.com|PS Online
Passions on NBC
Fox at NBC
Fox at Soap Central

Passions characters
Television characters introduced in 2002
Male characters in television
Fictional businesspeople
Fictional gamblers